MA-4 may refer to:

 
 Massachusetts Route 4
 Mercury-Atlas 4, a test flight of Project Mercury